The Manhuaçu River is a river of Minas Gerais state in southeastern Brazil.

The river is in the Doce River basin.
It runs past the Feliciano Miguel Abdala Private Natural Heritage Reserve, located on its left bank, home to one of the last wild populations of northern muriqui woolly spider monkeys.

See also
 List of rivers of Minas Gerais

References

Sources
 Map from Ministry of Transport
 Rand McNally, The New International Atlas, 1993.

Rivers of Minas Gerais